Florin Fabian (born 23 August 1974, in Satu Mare) is a former football player. As player, he played in Liga I for Universitatea Craiova and Extensiv Craiova.

Honours

Coach
FCM Baia Mare
Liga III: 2008–09

References

1974 births
Living people
Romanian footballers
Association football forwards
FC Olimpia Satu Mare players
CS Minaur Baia Mare (football) players
Romanian football managers
FC Olimpia Satu Mare managers
CS Minaur Baia Mare (football) managers
CS Academica Recea managers
FC Ripensia Timișoara managers
Sportspeople from Satu Mare